The Austral was a French automobile manufactured in Paris in 1907; the company offered "touring tricars" and motorized delivery tricycles.

Brass Era vehicles
Defunct motor vehicle manufacturers of France
Manufacturing companies based in Paris